Urban School of San Francisco is an independent coeducational high school located in the Haight-Ashbury district in San Francisco, California.

History
Urban was founded in 1966 by a group of Marin Country Day School parents. Urban has grown from 22 students into a student body of over 400.

Leadership 
After 32 years, Mark Salkind, a 1970 Urban graduate, retired as Head of School in June 2019. Dan B. Miller was appointed Head of School in July 2019.

Student life
Urban has over 40 student clubs, as well as student government, an active outdoor and class trips program, and a student newspaper, yearbook, and online literary and arts journal. Performing arts opportunities include fall and winter theater productions, circus class performances, and the annual One Acts Festival, as well as comprehensive jazz band, choral, and ensemble programs.

Athletics
A member of the Bay Area Conference and Bay Counties League-West (BCL-West), Urban hosts title-winning interscholastic teams in baseball, basketball, cross-country, fencing, golf, lacrosse, soccer, softball, tennis and volleyball. Athletic practices and games are held in the Mark Salkind Center Gym, the St. Agnes Gym, and other venues throughout the city and in Golden Gate Park. Over 65 percent of all Urban students participate on 27 boys, girls and co-ed athletic teams in the department.

Student newspaper
Urban's student newspaper, called "The Urban Legend," is a member of the National Scholastic Press Association.

Notable alumni
Writing
 Hannah Dreier, Pulitzer Prize winning investigative reporter
 Phoebe Gloeckner, cartoonist, illustrator, painter, novelist
 Rebecca Walker, author, activist, producer, daughter of Alice Walker

Athletics
 Jené Morris, WNBA Guard
 Onome Ojo, former American football wide receiver in the NFL

Entertainment
 Alison Elliott, actress
 Gypsy Snider, director, choreographer, former acrobat

Food Services
 Bobby Chinn, chef, restaurateur

See also

San Francisco high schools

References

External links
 

High schools in San Francisco
Haight-Ashbury, San Francisco
Private high schools in California
Educational institutions established in 1966
1966 establishments in California